The Palestine national baseball team is the national baseball team of Palestine. The team represents Palestine in international competitions.

The team is controlled by the Palestinian Baseball and Softball Federation, which is a member of the Baseball Federation of Asia since .

Results and fixtures
The following is a list of professional baseball match results currently active in the latest version of the WBSC World Rankings, as well as any future matches that have been scheduled.

Legend

2023

Regional competition

West Asia Baseball Cup

Palestine's first appearance at the Asian Baseball Cup was in 2023. Their best finish was as runners up, where they lost to West Asian powerhouse Pakistan.

International tournament results

World Baseball Classic

Current squad 
Palestine's roster for the 2023 West Asia Cup, the last official competition in which the team took part.

References

National baseball teams in Asia